Beach Bridge, or Beach Drawbridge, is a railroad swing bridge over Beach Thorofare Waterway in Atlantic City, Atlantic County, New Jersey, United States just west of the Atlantic City Rail Terminal. It carries the New Jersey Transit Rail Operations (NJT) Atlantic City Line at milepoint mile 68.9 and is parallel to the Atlantic City Expressway. Built in 1922, the swing bridge was rehabilitated in 1988 and 2004.  Operation of bridge openings for maritime traffic is provided by the Title 33 of the Code of Federal Regulations.

An earlier bridge at the location had been the site of the 1906 Atlantic City train wreck.

See also

 West Jersey and Seashore Railroad
 Atlantic City Railroad
 NJT movable bridges

References 

NJ Transit bridges
Bridges completed in 1922
Swing bridges in the United States
Buildings and structures in Atlantic City, New Jersey
Transportation buildings and structures in Atlantic County, New Jersey
Pennsylvania-Reading Seashore Lines
Pennsylvania Railroad bridges
Reading Railroad bridges
Bridges in Atlantic County, New Jersey